Ukleisee is a lake in Kreis Ostholstein, Schleswig-Holstein, Germany. At an elevation of 26.5 m, its surface area is 0.32 km². This lake is (as numerous other lakes in this area) a kettle hole, remaining from Weichselian glaciation.

Lakes of Schleswig-Holstein